Miyuki Tai (born 24 March 1980) is a retired Japanese badminton player from NTT East Club.

Achievements

IBF Grand Prix
The World Badminton Grand Prix sanctioned by International Badminton Federation (IBF) since 1983.

Women's doubles

IBF International 
Women's doubles

Mixed doubles

References 

1980 births
Living people
Sportspeople from Ishikawa Prefecture
Japanese female badminton players